The River Street Bridge is a bridge on the Charles River in Boston, Massachusetts, connecting River Street in Cambridge to Cambridge Street in Allston near the southern end of the Harvard University campus.  It was built in 1925 by the Commonwealth of Massachusetts Metropolitan District Commission.

The bridge carries one-way traffic going east, into Cambridge.  Westbound traffic must take the nearby Western Avenue Bridge.

History 

The original bridge at the site, a wooden drawbridge, was built in 1810.  The bridge was built in response to the 1793 construction of the West Boston Bridge (at the site of the current Longfellow Bridge), because the two bridges together greatly shortened the route from Boston to Cambridge, which previously had to take a highway around the Back Bay through Roxbury.

The current reinforced-concrete bridge was constructed in 1925 with three arches that span 330 feet.  It was designed by Robert P. Bellows in a style resembling the Pont Neuf in Paris.

References

External links 

Bridges in Boston
Bridges completed in 1925
Buildings and structures in Cambridge, Massachusetts
Bridges in Middlesex County, Massachusetts
Road bridges in Massachusetts
Bridges over the Charles River
Concrete bridges in the United States
Arch bridges in the United States